HFR or Hfr may refer to:

 High frame rate, in motion pictures
 Hfr cell, or Hfr strain, a bacterium with a conjugative plasmid